Erfan Maftoolkar is an Iranian footballer who plays as a forward for Foolad Yazd in the Azadegan League.

Club career statistics 

Last Update: 5 September 2014

Honours

Club
Sepahan
Iran Pro League (1): 2014–15

References

Sepahan S.C. footballers
1994 births
Living people
Sportspeople from Isfahan
Giti Pasand players
Iran under-20 international footballers
Iranian footballers
Association football forwards